The John Mackey Award is presented annually to college football's most outstanding tight end. Established in 2000 by the Nassau County Sports Commission, the award is given annually to the tight end who best exemplifies the play, sportsmanship, academics, and community values of Pro Football Hall of Fame tight end John Mackey.

The award is a member of the National College Football Awards Association, which encompasses college football's most prestigious awards. Former Florida State tight end Nick O'Leary called the award one which "all tight ends dream of winning".

Winners

References
General
 

Footnotes

External links

College football national player awards
Awards established in 2000